Xiaogan is a prefecture-level city in east-central Hubei province, People's Republic of China, some  northwest of the provincial capital of Wuhan. According to the 2020 census, its population totaled 4,270,371, of whom 988,479 lived in the built-up (or metro) area of Xiaonan District.

The city name Xiaogan, meaning Filial Piety Moves Tian, is from the story of Dong Yong, who sold himself for his father's funeral, in The Twenty-four Filial Exemplars.

The Sheshui River originates in Xiaogan's Dawu County. On the third day of the third month of the lunar calendar, many in Wuhan eat 'di cai zhu ji dan' which is supposed to prevent illness in the coming year. This practice is related to a story involving Shennong in Xiaogan.

Administrative divisions

Since 2000, Xiaogan has been divided into 1 district, 3 county-level cities and 3 counties:
Xiaonan District
Yingcheng City
Anlu City
Hanchuan City
Xiaochang County
Dawu County
Yunmeng County

Climate

Food
Xiaogan Rice wine (孝感米酒)

Notable people from Xiaogan
 Cheng Shicai
 Liu Zhen

Sister cities
 Brest, Belarus

References

Further reading

  .

External links

Xiaogan Government Website
International Students Study in Xiaogan

 
Cities in Hubei
Prefecture-level divisions of Hubei
Wuhan urban agglomeration